The 2006 European Pairs Speedway Championship was the third edition of the European Pairs Speedway Championship. The final was held in Lendava, Slovenia on 5 August. Poland won their second title.

Semifinal 1
  Rivne
 May 27

Draw 1.  →  
Draw 2.  →  B
Draw 3.  →  C

Semifinal 2
  Lonigo
 June 2

Final
  Lendava
 August 5

Draw 1.  →

See also
 2006 Individual Speedway European Championship

References 

2006
European P